Monica Bristow was a Democratic member of the Illinois House of Representatives, representing the 111th District from December 18, 2017, to January 13, 2021. The 111th district, located in the Metro East, includes all or parts of Alton, Bethalto, East Alton, Edwardsville, Elsah, Godfrey, Granite City, Hartford, Holiday Shores, Madison, Pontoon Beach, Rosewood Heights, Roxana, South Roxana, and Wood River. Prior to her appointment, she spent 14 years as President of the RiverBend Growth Association, an economic development association in Madison County, Illinois.

In the 2020 general election, Bristow lost to Republican candidate Amy Elik of Fosterburg by a 9-point margin.

Electoral History

References

External links
 Representative Monica Bristow (D) 111th District at Illinois General Assembly official website
By session: 100th

Year of birth missing (living people)
Living people
21st-century American politicians
21st-century American women politicians
Democratic Party members of the Illinois House of Representatives
People from Godfrey, Illinois
Women state legislators in Illinois